Sally J. Clark is a former member of the Seattle City Council.

Education
A graduate of the University of Washington (BAs in Political Science and Spanish, and an MPA from the UW’s Evans School of Public Affairs), Clark started her career as a print journalist.

Clark’s career includes work with Seattle’s Department of Neighborhoods, the Metropolitan King County Council, Northwest Association for Housing Affordability, and Lifelong AIDS Alliance.

In 2012, Clark completed Harvard University's John F. Kennedy School of Government program for Senior Executives in State and Local Government as a David Bohnett LGBTQ Victory Institute Leadership Fellow. She is a 2013-2014 Aspen Rodel Fellow.

Political career 
Appointed to fill the vacant seat formerly occupied by Jim Compton in January 2006, Clark was elected to a one-year term in November 2006, a four-year term in 2007, and a second four-year term in 2011. Prior to her resignation (effective April 12, 2015) Clark served as the Chair of the City Council’s Committee on Housing Affordability, Human Services, and Economic Resiliency.  Clark also served as the Chair of the Select Committee on Minimum Wage and Income Inequality and the Chair of the Select Committee on Taxi, For-Hire, and Limousine Regulations. Clark was additionally a member of the council's Energy Committee and Education and Governance Committee.
During her time on the city council, Sally served as the Council President and as the Chair of the Committee on the Built Environment.

Clark spearheaded a vote unpopular with 48% of residents of the city of Seattle, but favored by Taxi industry members. The vote intended to limit the ability of popular ride share companies to operate, by capping the number of drivers they could employ at any time. The movement, led by Sally passed the Seattle city council 6-3 on March 17.

Personal life
Sally and her partner live in the Brighton neighborhood of Southeast Seattle near Seward Park.

References

External links 
 Council homepage
 Campaign website

Living people
Seattle City Council members
Lesbian politicians
American LGBT city council members
LGBT people from Washington (state)
Women city councillors in Washington (state)
Year of birth missing (living people)
University of Washington College of Arts and Sciences alumni
Evans School of Public Policy and Governance alumni
21st-century American women